Jane Lee (1912–1957) and Katherine Lee (1909–1968), sisters, were child stars in silent motion pictures and vaudeville theatre. They were also known as the "Baby Grands," "Lee Kids," or the "Fox Kiddies" for their appearances in Fox Film productions.

The Lee sisters were the children of American juggler Tommy Banahan and Irene Lee, an Irish dancer and occasional actor. During Tommy and Irene's European tour, Katherine was born in Berlin, Germany on February 14, 1909, and Jane born February 15, 1912, in either Dublin, Ireland, or Glasgow, Scotland. The sisters appeared in the original Neptune's Daughter, filmed in 1914. In 1915, Jane appeared with Valeska Suratt in The Soul of Broadway at Fox Studios.  They both appeared in A Daughter of the Gods (1916), with Katherine's dramatic performance earning praise as a "child prodigy" and a "three-foot Fiske." In 1917,  Jane and Katherine starred in two of Fox's "kiddie films", Troublemakers and Two Little Imps. In 1919, the Lee sisters made the list in the Top Ten Money Making Stars Poll.

The Lee sisters continued to act in silent films through 1919. They appeared in Swat the Spy (1918), Tell It to the Marines (1918), and Smiles (1919). Jane and Katherine continued performing in vaudeville throughout the 1920s and into early 1930s.  Jane later had uncredited roles in the sound motion pictures Knock on Any Door (1949), Cheaper By the Dozen (1950), and Comin' Round The Mountain (1951).

Jane married actor James E. Grant in New York on April 5, 1933, and they divorced in 1937. She died in New York's St. Clare's Hospital on March 7, 1957; her married name at the time was St. John. Katherine married Ray Miller of New York, and died in 1968.


Partial filmography

See also
Madeline and Marion Fairbanks, identical twin actresses in film and theatre
The Duncan Sisters, American vaudeville duo

References

External links

 
 
Jane and Katherine Lee in a clip from Dixie Madcaps on YouTube

20th-century American actresses
American child actresses
American silent film actresses
Sibling duos
Sisters
Vaudeville performers